Elle McNicoll (born October 5, 1992) is a Scottish children's writer.

McNicoll's  debut novel, A Kind of Spark (2020) follows the efforts of an autistic eleven-year-old girl, Addie, to establish a memorial to the witch trials in her Scottish hometown. McNicoll is autistic herself. The book was children's book of the week in The Times and The Sunday Times, and won both the Overall and Younger Fiction prizes at the 2021 Waterstones Children's Book Prize. It also won the Blue Peter Book Award for Best Story, voted for by children. McNicoll was also nominated for the Branford Boase Award  and was nominated for the Carnegie Medal. McNicoll's debut was also named Overall Book of the Year by Blackwell's , beating titles in the Adult Market.

Her second novel, Show Us Who You Are, was published in March, 2021, and was Children's Book of the Week in The Times. It was also the Children's Book of the Month, as chosen by Blackwell's. It was nominated for Best Children's Fiction in the 2021 Books Are My Bag Awards, and McNicoll was also nominated for Best Breakthrough Author.

Her third novel Like A Charm was published in February 2022 by Knights Of and was also Children's Book of the Week in The Times, as well as being reviewed as 'Another fiercely gripping, superbly original story' by The Guardian. In 2022 McNicoll also wrote a story as part of the crime anthology The Very Merry Murder Club  edited by Serena Patel and Robin Stevens.

McNicoll was awarded an honour by the Schneider Family Book Award in 2022 for the US edition of A Kind of Spark.

McNicoll has been described as "undoubtedly an outstanding new talent in children’s books [who] will inspire readers young and old for generations to come”.

Her debut novel has also been optioned for a television adaptation and McNicoll is involved in the development of the script.

McNicoll has been an outspoken advocate for better representations of neurodiversity in publishing. In 2022, McNicoll established The Adrien Prize, a prize for traditionally published children's books with a disabled lead character. The longlist for The Adrien Prize 2022 was announced on twitter and included: The Night the Moon Went Out by Samantha Baines, The Secret of Haven Point by Lisette Auton, A Flash of Fireflies by Aisha Bushby, Wilder Than Midnight by Cerrie Burnell, The Great Fox Illusion by Justyn Edwards and The Extraordinary Adventures of Alice Tonks by Emily Kenny.

She currently lives in East London.

Works
 A Kind of Spark. London: Knights of, 2020.
 Show Us Who You Are. London: Knights of, 2021.
 Like A Charm. London: Knights of, 2022.

References

External links
 Official website

Living people
Scottish children's writers
British women children's writers
21st-century Scottish women writers
People on the autism spectrum
1992 births